The 1958 Ohio State Buckeyes football team represented the Ohio State University in the 1958 Big Ten Conference football season. The Buckeyes compiled a 6–1–2 record.

Schedule

Roster

Game summaries

SMU

Washington

Illinois

Indiana

Wisconsin

Northwestern

Purdue

Iowa

    
    
    
    
    
    
    
    
    
    

Statistics
Rushing: Bob White 209 yards, three touchdowns

Michigan

Coaching staff
 Woody Hayes – Head Coach – 8th year

1959 NFL draftees

References

Ohio State
Ohio State Buckeyes football seasons
Ohio State Buckeyes football